is a Japanese footballer who since 2014 has played as a midfielder for Ehime FC  in J3 League.

Career

Nagoya Grampus
Yada made his official debut for Nagoya Grampus in the J. League Division 1 on 25 April 2014 against Sagan Tosu in Mizuho Athletic Stadium in Nagoya, Japan. He subbed in for Riki Matsuda in the 66th minutes and played the rest of the game. Yada and his club lost the match 2-3 due to a last minute goal scored by Hiroyuki Taniguchi

Career statistics

Club
Updated to end of 2018 season.

References

External links 
Profile at Nagoya Grampus

 

1991 births
Living people
Meiji University alumni
Association football people from Mie Prefecture
Japanese footballers
J1 League players
J2 League players
J3 League players
Nagoya Grampus players
JEF United Chiba players
Ehime FC players
Association football midfielders